Dione Housheer (born 26 September 1999) is a Dutch female handballer for Odense Håndbold and the Dutch national team.

She represented the Netherlands at the 2019 World Women's Handball Championship.

Achievements
Eredivisie:
Winner: 2017, 2018
Beker van Nederland:
Winner: 2018
Nederlandse Supercup:
Winner: 2016
Danish Women's Handball League
Winner: 2021, 2022
Danish Cup
Winner: 2018
Finalist: 2020, 2022

Awards and recognition
 MVP of the Youth European Open Championship: 2016 
 Eredivisie Talent of the Year: 2017
 Eredivisie Player of the Year: 2018
 Best right back Danish Kvindeligaen 2021-2022
 Best young player nomination in the 2021–22 Women's EHF Champions League

References

External links

1999 births
Living people
Sportspeople from Gelderland
Dutch female handball players
Expatriate handball players
Dutch expatriate sportspeople in Denmark
Nykøbing Falster Håndboldklub players
Handball players at the 2020 Summer Olympics
21st-century Dutch women